Significavit is an obsolete writ in English ecclesiastical law, issued out of chancery, that a man be excommunicated for forty days, and imprisoned until he submits himself to the authority of the church. It is synonymous with the writ de excommunicate capiendo.

References

History of the Church of England
Ecclesiastical writs
Legal documents with Latin names